John More (1578–1638) was an English politician who sat in the House of Commons in 1624 and 1626.

More was the son of Thomas Moore of Faringdon in Berkshire. In 1624, he was elected member of parliament for Lymington in the Happy Parliament. He was elected MP for Lymington again in 1626. 
 
More died at the age of about 60.

References

1578 births
1638 deaths
English MPs 1624–1625
English MPs 1626
Members of the Parliament of England (pre-1707) for Lymington